
Gmina Belsk Duży is a rural gmina (administrative district) in Grójec County, Masovian Voivodeship, in east-central Poland.

Villages
Gmina Belsk Duży contains the villages and settlements of Aleksandrówka, Anielin, Bartodzieje, Belsk Duży, Belsk Mały, Bodzew, Boruty, Grotów, Jarochy, Julianów, Koziel, Kussy, Łęczeszyce, Lewiczyn, Maciejówka, Mała Wieś, Oczesały, Odrzywołek, Rębowola, Rosochów, Rożce, Sadków Duchowny, Sadków-Kolonia, Skowronki, Stara Wieś, Tartaczek, Widów, Wilczogóra, Wilczy Targ, Wola Łęczeszycka, Wola Starowiejska, Wólka Łęczeszycka, Zaborów and Zaborówek.

Neighbouring gminas
Gmina Belsk Duży is bordered by the gminas of Błędów, Goszczyn, Grójec, Jasieniec, Mogielnica and Pniewy.

References
Polish official population figures 2006

Belsk Duzy
Grójec County